The Thornthwaite climate classification is a climate classification system created by American climatologist Charles Warren Thornthwaite in 1931 and modified in 1948.

1931 classification

Precipitation effectiveness
Thornthwaite initially divided climates based on five characteristic vegetations: Rainforest, forest, grassland, steppe and desert. One of the main factors for the local vegetation is precipitation, but most importantly, precipitation effectiveness, according to Thornthwaite. Thornthwaite based the effectiveness of precipitation on an index (the P/E index), which is the sum of the 12 monthly P/E ratios. The monthly P/E ratio can be calculated using the formula:

Temperature efficiency
Similarly to precipitation effectiveness, Thornthwaite also developed a T/E index to represent thermal efficiency. Featuring six climate provinces: Tropical, mesothermal, microthermal, taiga, tundra and frost.

The T-E index is the sum of the 12 monthly T-E ratios, which can be calculated as:

, where t is the mean monthly temperature in °F.

1948 modification
After being criticized for making climatic classification complex, Thornthwaite switched vegetation with the concept of potential evapotranspiration (PET), which represents both precipitation effectiveness and thermal efficiency. Estimated PET can be calculated using Thornthwaite's own 1948 equation.

Thornthwaite developed four indices: the Moisture Index (Im), the aridity and humidity indexes (Ia/Ih), the Thermal Efficiency Index (TE) and the Summer Concentration of Thermal Efficiency (SCTE). Each of the four climatic types can be described by an English alphabet letter and are arranged exactly by the order shown previously. The first two letters are used to describe the precipitation pattern and the last two are used to describe the thermal regime. As an example, B3s2A’b’4 (Tracuateua) describes a wet (B3), megathermal (A’) climate with a large summer water deficit (s2) and which more than 48% but less than 52% of the potential evapotranspiration is felt in the summer (b’4).

Moisture Index

The Moisture Index (Im) expresses the global moisture of the environment and is directly related with the aridity and humidity indexes. The driving factor in this system is the water budget of a region. Humidity classes range from Arid to Perhumid (Thoroughly Humid).

Seasonal Variation of Effective Moisture
The Seasonal Variation of Effective Moisture is described by two indexes: The Aridity Index (Ia), used in wet climates to identify and quantify the severity of drought conditions, and the Humidity Index (Ih), used in dry climates to identify and quantify the severity of wet conditions. These indexes are represented by the equations:

,

, where D is the annual water deficit, S is the annual water surplus, and PET is the annual potential evapotranspiration

Furthermore, these indices are represented by four letters, which indicate the seasonal distribution of precipitation: r (constantly rainy), d (constantly dry), s (summer deficit or surplus) and w (winter deficit or surplus) and two numbers to indicate the severity.

Wet climates (A, B, C2) can be classified as:
r (Without or with low deficit) : 0 ≤ Ia < 16.7
s (Moderate summer deficit) : 16.7 ≤ Ia < 33.3 and the deficit in the summer is larger than in the winter
w (Moderate winter deficit) : 16.7 ≤ Ia < 33.3 and the deficit in the winter is larger than in the summer
s2 (Large summer deficit) : Ia ≥ 33.3 and the deficit in the summer is larger than in the winter
w2 (Large winter deficit) : Ia ≥ 33.3 and the deficit in the winter is larger than in the summer

Dry climates (C1, D, E) can be classified as:
d (Without or with low surplus) : 0 ≤ Ih < 10
s (Moderate summer surplus) : 10 ≤ Ih < 20 and the surplus in the summer is larger than in the winter
w (Moderate winter surplus) : 10 ≤ Ih < 20 and the surplus in the winter is larger than in the summer
s2 (Large summer surplus) : Ih ≥ 33.3 and the surplus in the summer is larger than in the winter
w2 (Large winter surplus) : Ih ≥ 33.3 and the surplus in the winter is larger than in the summer

The deficiency of water in the soil is calculated as the difference between the potential evapotranspiration and the actual evapotranspiration.

Thermal efficiency
The thermal efficiency index (TE) is defined as the annual potential evapotranspiration (PET) and has five different classifications: Megathermal, mesothermal, microthermal, tundra and perpetual ice.

Summer Concentration of Thermal Efficiency

References

Climate and weather classification systems